Antonio Asanović (born 9 August 1991 in Cannes) is Croatian footballer who plays as a central defender.

He is the son of Aljoša Asanović. He can also play in the position of defensive midfielder.

Club career
Antonio Asanović passed through the youth ranks of Hajduk Split, playing primarily as an offensive midfielder. He finished his first senior season with NK Primorac 1929. Reinvented as a centre back in Stobreč, he received a stipend contract with Hajduk, remaining on a season-long loan in Primorac, which became Hajduk's reserve team. The termination of his contract came at the beginning of the 2012–2013 season by mutual agreement. After a trial with Valenciennes, on 11 January 2013, he signed a 6-month contract with the Romanian Liga I club Turnu Severin., where he would become a permanent fixture until the end of the season, which saw the club's relegation.

References

External links
 Stats at HNL Statistika 
 
 
 

1991 births
Living people
Sportspeople from Cannes
Association football central defenders
Croatian footballers
NK Primorac 1929 players
CS Turnu Severin players
FC Dinamo București players
CSM Corona Brașov footballers
ŠK Senec players
FC DAC 1904 Dunajská Streda
NK Hrvace players
FC ViOn Zlaté Moravce players
FK Senica players
HNK Šibenik players
Liga I players
2. Liga (Slovakia) players
Slovak Super Liga players
Croatian Football League players
Croatian expatriate footballers
Expatriate footballers in Romania
Croatian expatriate sportspeople in Romania
Expatriate footballers in Switzerland
Croatian expatriate sportspeople in Switzerland
Expatriate footballers in Slovakia
Croatian expatriate sportspeople in Slovakia
Expatriate footballers in Greece
Croatian expatriate sportspeople in Greece
Footballers from Provence-Alpes-Côte d'Azur